Bryan Leung Kar-yan (Chinese: , born 20 January 1948) is a Hong Kong film and television actor and film director who has played roles in numerous acclaimed martial arts films. He is affectionately known as "Beardy" due to his trademark facial hair. He also has characteristic hyper-extendable fingers, which can be observed when he has his palms open and his fingers outstretched. Despite being one of the most well-known faces in Hong Kong action cinema, he had no formal martial arts training, relying on his talents at mimicry to imitate the moves shown to him by the action directors. He had Taiwan Nationality starting from 1985,& became Taiwanese. His nephew is the actor Oscar Leung.

Career
Leung's action film career began in 1969. His good looks and natural athleticism took him to Shaw Brothers, where he appeared in several renowned period kung fu films, although he was rarely offered leading roles. His big-break came under the direction of Sammo Hung, with whom he fought in Enter the Fat Dragon (1978), and co-starred in the seminal Warriors Two (1978). His performance in Warriors Two, as Mr. Tsan, a real-life historical doctor and master of Wing Chun, is described as "the best performance of his career" by Mark Pollard of Kung Fu Cinema, who goes on to write:
Leung Kar-yan is brilliant in his role as the teacher. He adds just the right amount of austerity and presence without overdoing it. It is also obvious why he was chosen for this role over an older actor. To the layman, he really looks like a Wing Chun expert and his physical grace is undeniable.

Leung continued to work with Sammo Hung, achieving further success with a string of highly rated kung-fu comedies, including Knockabout (1979), where he and Yuen Biao played crooks being harassed by a kung-fu beggar played by Hung.

In Dreadnaught (1981), he played Wong Fei-hung's student (without his trademark beard). The film again featured Yuen Biao, as well as veteran kung-fu star Kwan Tak-hing playing Wong Fei-hung. It also marked Leung's first collaboration with director Yuen Woo-ping, and he would go on to star in several acclaimed Yuen Woo-ping directed films, including Legend of a Fighter (1982), in which he portrayed historical figure Fok Yuen-gap, and The Miracle Fighters (1982).

During this same period, Leung also enjoyed some success in television acting, appearing as Kiu Fung in TVB's 1982 adaptation of Louis Cha's Wuxia novel Demi-Gods and Semi-Devils and as Kwok Ching in the 1983 adaptation of The Return of the Condor Heroes.

Despite this acting success, Leung's 1984 directorial debut, Profile in Anger, was relatively unsuccessful. This marked a lowering of his star profile, as he began to take more supporting roles and less leading roles. He continues to act and direct into the 2000s, occasionally appearing in high-profile films like Last Hero in China (1993), where he co-starred with Jet Li and reprised the role he had played in 1981's Dreadnaught, and several Stephen Chow vehicles including Legend of the Dragon (1990).

In 2009, Leung is to direct once again in a new martial arts action film tentatively titled Blood Relations. He will also star in the film alongside his son Leung Ho-yee and martial arts film actor Gordon Liu.

Filmography

Film

Television

References

External links

Hong Kong Cinemagic: Leung Kar Yan

1948 births
Living people
Hong Kong male film actors
Hong Kong film directors
Hong Kong film producers
Hong Kong screenwriters
Hong Kong male television actors
Action choreographers
20th-century Hong Kong male actors
21st-century Hong Kong male actors